Puli Bidda is a 1981 Telugu-language sports drama film directed by V. Madhusudhana Rao and produced by N. Seshagiri Rao under Heramba Chitra Mandir. The film stars Krishnam Raju and Sridevi. It is a remake of the 1978 Kannada film Thayige Thakka Maga.
The soundtrack was composed by Chakravarthy. Krishnam Raju acted as a boxer in the film.

Cast
Krishnam Raju as boxer
Sridevi
Sowcar Janaki as Annapurna
Anjali Devi as Vishalaakshi
Kaikala Satyanarayana
Prabhakar Reddy
Ceylon Manohar

Soundtrack
"Veyyi Veyyi Vanthena" - S.P. Balasubramaniam, P. Susheela
"Nadumaa Kunneledi Nadumaa" - S.P. Balasubramaniam, P. Susheela
"Manasanthu" - S.P. Balasubramaniam, P. Susheela
"Kasee Viswanatha" - S.P. Balasubramaniam
"Bujjipapa" - P. Susheela

References

External links
 

1981 films
1980s Telugu-language films
Indian boxing films
Indian sports drama films
1980s sports drama films
Films directed by V. Madhusudhana Rao
Films scored by K. Chakravarthy
Telugu remakes of Kannada films
1981 drama films